Zehava Ben (born Zehava Benisti; ; November 8, 1968) is an Israeli singer. Ben is one of the most popular Israeli female vocalists in the Mizrahi music genre; the Middle Eastern-style of singing rising from Israel's Mizrahi Jewish population, dominating Israeli music in the 1990s and popular ever since.

Early life
Ben was born Zehava Benisti in Beersheba, the capital city of the Negev in Southern Israel, in Shikun Dalet (Neighborhood D), a poor neighborhood, to a Moroccan Jewish family. She has an identical twin sister named Esther 'Etti' Levy who is also a musician.

Zehava is very proud of her Moroccan heritage, and most of her music is quite distinctive of that, singing both in Hebrew and Moroccan Arabic.

Music career
Zehava became familiar in Israel in 1989, when a song and album called "Tipat Mazal" (A Bit of Luck), became a hit throughout Israel, primarily among Israel's Mizrahi Jews (Jews of Middle Eastern and North African backgrounds) and Arab Israelis. The title track is a Hebrew cover for the 1984 song Dil Yarasi by the Turkish musician Orhan Gencebay. A few years later, Ben also participated in a film bearing the same name.

One of her famous songs, "Ma Yihye" (What Will Be) from 1994, was featured in the Buddha Bar collection.

Despite her music being banned in some Arab countries due to the Arab League boycott of Israel, Zehava gained popularity throughout the Arab world as an Arabic-language singer. Among her repertoire are re-makes of traditional Arabic hits, including "Enta Omri" (You Are My Life) by legendary Egyptian singer Umm Kulthum.

Zehava appeared in the 1996 election campaign for the left-wing political party Meretz, singing the famous "Shir LaShalom" (Song For Peace) together with Dana Berger. This was the same song the late prime minister Yitzhak Rabin sang in a rally before his assassination a few months earlier.

After 9/11, Ben and Etti Ankri, David D'Or, Arkadi Duchin, and other Israeli singers recorded the title song "Yesh Od Tikvah" ("Our Hope Endures"), for which D'Or wrote the music and lyrics, on the CD Yesh Od Tikvah/You've Got a Friend. The CD, released by Hed Arzi in 2002, benefited Israeli terror victims, with all proceeds going to NATAL Israel: the Israel Trauma center for Victims of Terror and War.

In 2005, Zehava Ben entered a song contest to represent Israel in the Eurovision Song Contest with the song "Peace And Love" (sung in Hebrew, Arabic and English). She reached second place to winner Shiri Maimon (another Jewish Israeli of Moroccan heritage).

Ben has appeared in many music festivals outside Israel, including in Sweden and France.

Records and Discography
1999: Best of Zehava Ben
2000: Arabic Songs
2000: Crying Rain
2000: Stop the World
2000: What Kind of World
2000: White Stork
2000: Super Gold
2001: Coming Home
2001: Real King
2001: To Be Human
2002: Melech Amiti (A Real King)
2003: Beit Avi (My Father's House)
2003: Laroz Variations
2003: My Father's House
2003: Looking Forward
2003: To Be a Man
2004: Zehava Ben
2005: Sings Arabic vol. 1
2005: Sings Arabic vol. 2
2005: Children's Songs
2006: The Best of Zehava Ben
2008: Going with the Light
2009: The Best of the Best
2011: Nights at Home

See also
 Kdam Eurovision
 Mizrahi Music

References

External links
Zehava Ben Official Web Site – Zehava Ben's Official Web Site.

1968 births
Living people
Arabic-language singers of Israel
21st-century Israeli women singers
20th-century Israeli women singers
Israeli people of Moroccan-Jewish descent
Jewish Israeli musicians
Jewish women singers
Musicians from Beersheba
Israeli twins
Big Brother (franchise) winners